The Albatros C.II was a 1910s German military pusher reconnaissance biplane designed and built by Albatros Flugzeugwerke. Only one aircraft (Idflieg no. C 27/15) was built and the type did not enter production.

Design
The C.II used the wings and landing gear of the earlier C.I but was fitted with a short nacelle rather than a conventional fuselage. The nacelle housed a  Benz Bz.III engine in a pusher configuration with a two-bladed propeller. The nacelle had an open cockpit for the observer/gunner at the front and the pilot behind. The tail structure used an open frame with a conventional fin and rudder and garnered the nickname Gitterschwanz (en: lattice tail).

This aircraft should not to be confused with the OAW (Albatros) C.II which was an unrelated aircraft produced by the Albatros Schneidemühl factory in Austria, known as OAW. (Ostdeutsche Albatros Werke GmbH).

Specifications

References

Notes

Bibliography

 

1910s German military reconnaissance aircraft
Military aircraft of World War I
C.02
Aircraft first flown in 1916